Espíritu (Spanish for "Spirit") may refer to:

Espíritu (band)
Espíritu (wrestler)
Vanessa Quinones, a singer who has used the alias Espiritu